= Latino Perspectives Magazine =

Monthly magazine

Latino Perspectives Magazine was a monthly American magazine for English-speaking Hispanic Americans. Founded in September 2004, print publication ended in 2013. In 2016, Latino Perspectives was relaunched by Panorama Media as an online magazine.

Latino Perspectives was founded in September 2004 in Phoenix Arizona, by Ricardo Torres and published by Latino Perspectives Media. Its audience was primarily located in the Southwestern United States.

In its first year, Latino Perspectives was run by editor James E. Garcia. Garcia, contributing writer Anita Mabante Leach and creative director Charles Sanderson. It received honors from the Arizona Press Club in May 2005.

The print version of Latino Perspectives stopped after the December 2013 issue. In 2016 it was re-launched as an online magazine by Panorama Media.
